The Rural Municipality of Fertile Valley No. 285 is a rural municipality (RM) in the Canadian province of Saskatchewan within Census Division No. 12 and  Division No. 5. It is located in the southwest portion of the province.

History 
The RM of Fertile Valley No. 285 incorporated as a rural municipality on December 13, 1909.

Geography

Communities and localities 
The following urban municipalities are surrounded by the RM.

Villages
 Conquest
 Macrorie

The following unincorporated communities are within the RM.

Localities
 Anerley
 Ardath (dissolved as a village December 31, 1972)
 Betalock
 Bounty (dissolved as a village November 25, 1997)
 Bratton
 Surbiton

Demographics 

Government 
The RM of Fertile Valley No. 285 is governed by an elected municipal council and an appointed administrator that meets on the second Wednesday of every month. The reeve of the RM is Barry Friesen while its administrator is L Jean Jones. The RM's office is located in Conquest.

Transportation

See also 
List of rural municipalities in Saskatchewan

References 

F